Greenwood is an unincorporated community in Wayne Township, Wayne County, in the U.S. state of Indiana.

It is located within the city limits of Richmond.

Geography

References

Unincorporated communities in Wayne County, Indiana
Unincorporated communities in Indiana